The Burbank Leader is a weekly newspaper published by the Outlook Newspaper Group in Burbank, California.

History
The Burbank Daily Review was founded in 1908, and later acquired by the Copley Press. Copley sold the Daily Review and the Glendale News Press to Morris Newspapers in 1974; however Morris sold off the papers two years later. Ingersoll Publications bought the papers in 1980. The Daily Review was replaced by the biweekly Burbank Leader in 1985.

Page Group Publishing, who had just bought the Orange Coast Daily Pilot and the Huntington Beach Independent, acquired the papers from Ingersoll in 1989. Times Mirror bought the newspaper group in 1993.

On April 18, 2020, it was announced by the Los Angeles Times that the newspaper would cease publication. Before the closure, the print circulation was around 5,000 copies. On April 30, 2020, the Burbank Leader was purchased by the Outlook Newspaper Group. The newspaper will continue to be published by its new owner.

References

External links
Official website

Daily newspapers published in Greater Los Angeles
Los Angeles Times
1908 establishments in California
Burbank, California
Mass media in Los Angeles County, California
Tribune Publishing